Umet is a rural locality (a selo) and the administrative center of Umyotovskoye Rural Settlement, Kamyshinsky District, Volgograd Oblast, Russia. The population was 1,248 as of 2010. There are 18 streets.

Geography 
Umet is located in forest steppe, on the Volga Upland, on the Ilovlya River, 29 km north of Kamyshin (the district's administrative centre) by road. Veselovo is the nearest rural locality.

References 

Rural localities in Kamyshinsky District
Kamyshinsky Uyezd